The Black Student Union Center of Heidelberg College in Tiffin, Ohio, located at 120 Hedges St., was built in 1920.  It was listed on the National Register of Historic Places in 1979.

At the time of writing of the Heidelberg College Multiple Resources Assessment, the union was not considered to be NRHP-eligible.

References

University and college buildings on the National Register of Historic Places in Ohio
National Register of Historic Places in Seneca County, Ohio
Buildings and structures completed in 1920